Ctenophoraster is a genus of echinoderms belonging to the family Astropectinidae.

The species of this genus are found in Indian and Pacific Ocean.

Species:

Ctenophoraster diploctenius 
Ctenophoraster donghaiensis 
Ctenophoraster downeyae 
Ctenophoraster hawaiiensis 
Ctenophoraster marquesensis

References

Astropectinidae
Asteroidea genera